Macarthur Square is a large indoor/outdoor shopping centre located in the south western Sydney suburb of Campbelltown, New South Wales, Australia. The shopping centre was opened by the Lend Lease Corporation and GPT Group on 10 September 1979. The shopping centre is situated adjacent to Macarthur Railway Station, where trains terminate on the Airport & South Line.

History 

Macarthur Square was opened on 10 September 1979 by The Hon. Paul Landa, Minister for Planning and Environment. Macarthur Square was seen as a major regional shopping centre for the Macarthur Growth Centre in south-western Sydney. The NSW State Planning Authority purchased large tracts of land in the Campbelltown area in the 1960s. The Authority produced a structure plan in 1973 under the title of the Campbelltown-Camden-Appin Three Cities Plan. State and Commonwealth funding established a growth centre in the region. An agreement between the Liberal Government in NSW and the Whitlam Labor Government in Canberra provided funds for land acquisition and urban development. The Growth Centre was called Macarthur Growth Centre and established a development board. The Macarthur Development Board bought and sold land, developed industrial estates and the Macarthur Square shopping centre. In December 1983 a 3 year old boy named Ali Elassad while looking at Christmas decorations with his older brother plunged 10 metres from one of the balconies to the floor below and fractured his skull however he survived and returned home in time for Christmas and was dubbed "The miracle boy of Sydney".

Shopping / Facilities 

Major retailers of Macarthur Square include David Jones, Big W, Target, Coles, Rebel, Lincraft, H&M, Aldi, Woolworths, Dan Murphy's, JB Hi-Fi, Cotton On, Kingpin Bowling and Event Cinemas. The centre also features an outdoor entertainment and restaurant precinct known as "Kellicar Lane". This area opened during the expansion in November 2005. Above Kellicar Lane is a food court that has large glass windows that look over Kellicar Lane, Campbelltown and the surrounding countryside.

2016/17 Development 
This $240 million development added a relocated and refurbished Coles supermarket, a redeveloped flagship David Jones store, and a new H&M, as well as a new fresh food hall, dining terrace and 45 speciality stores. In addition, a new Aldi supermarket and full line Harris Scarfe store were developed end of 2017, in order to cement the destinations title as the most important shopping centre in the Macarthur region. Harris Scarfe has since closed down.

References

External links
 Macarthur Square home page

Shopping centres in Sydney
Shopping malls established in 1979
1979 establishments in Australia
Squares in Sydney